Vladimir Markov may refer to:

 Vladimir Markov (mathematician) (1871–1897), Russian mathematician
 Vladimir Markov (footballer, born 1889) (1889–1942), Russian football defender
 Vladimir Markov (politician) (1859–1919), Finnish general and politician
 Vladimir Ivanovich Markov, Latvian artist also known as Voldemārs Matvejs